The 2014–15 Regional Four Day Competition was the 49th edition of the Regional Four Day Competition, the domestic first-class cricket competition for the countries of the West Indies Cricket Board (WICB). The competition ran from 14 November 2014 to 20 March 2015, with a mid-season gap to allow for the 2014–15 Regional Super50.

Six teams contested the competition – Barbados, Guyana, Jamaica, the Leeward Islands, Trinidad and Tobago, and the Windward Islands. Unlike in previous seasons, each team played the other teams twice, once at home and once away. Guyana registered eight wins from their ten matches to claim a sixth title. Guyana's Veerasammy Permaul led the tournament in wickets, while Windward Islands batsman Devon Smith led the tournament in runs.

Teams and squads

Points table

Fixtures

Statistics

Most runs
The top five run-scorers are included in this table, listed by runs scored and then by batting average.

Source: CricketArchive

Most wickets

The top five wicket-takers are listed in this table, listed by wickets taken and then by bowling average.

Source: CricketArchive

External links
 Series home at ESPNcricinfo

References

2014 in West Indian cricket
2015 in West Indian cricket
Regional Four Day Competition seasons